Jimmy Jackson (born May 10, 1975), also known as J.J. Jackson, is an American former professional tennis player.

Born and raised in North Carolina, Jackson trained out of Hendersonville before relocating to Tampa. He won the boys' doubles title at the 1992 US Open (with Eric Taino) and was a world number one ranked junior doubles player.

Jackson competed mostly in satellite tournaments and reached a best singles world ranking of 602. In 1994 he featured in the men's singles qualifying for the US Open. Retiring in 1999, he now coaches tennis in Seattle.

Junior Grand Slam titles

Doubles (1)

References

External links
 
 

1975 births
Living people
American male tennis players
US Open (tennis) junior champions
Grand Slam (tennis) champions in boys' doubles
Tennis people from North Carolina